In computing, a devicetree (also written device tree) is a data structure describing the hardware components of a particular computer so that the operating system's kernel can use and manage those components, including the CPU or CPUs, the memory, the buses and the integrated peripherals.

The device tree was derived from SPARC-based computers via the Open Firmware project. The current Devicetree specification
is targeted at smaller systems, but is still used with some server-class systems (for instance, those described by the Power Architecture Platform Reference).

Personal computers with the x86 architecture generally do not use device trees, relying instead on various auto configuration protocols (e.g. ACPI) to discover hardware. Systems which use device trees usually pass a static device tree (perhaps stored in ROM) to the operating system, but can also generate a device tree in the early stages of booting. As an example, Das U-Boot and kexec can pass a device tree when launching a new operating system. On systems with a boot loader that does not support device trees, a static device tree may be installed along with the operating system; the Linux kernel supports this approach.

The Devicetree specification is currently managed by a community named devicetree.org, which is associated with, among others, Linaro and Arm.

Formats
A device tree can hold any kind of data as internally it is a tree of named nodes and properties. Nodes contain properties and child nodes, while properties are name–value pairs.

Device trees have both a binary format for operating systems to use and a textual format for convenient editing and management.

Usage

Linux 
Given the correct device tree, the same compiled kernel can support different hardware configurations within a wider architecture family. The Linux kernel for the ARC, ARM, C6x, H8/300, MicroBlaze, MIPS, NDS32, Nios II, OpenRISC, PowerPC, RISC-V, SuperH, and Xtensa architectures reads device tree information; on ARM, device trees have been mandatory for all new SoCs since 2012. This can be seen as a remedy to the vast number of forks (of Linux and Das U-Boot) that have historically been created to support (marginally) different ARM boards. The purpose is to move a significant part of the hardware description out of the kernel binary, and into the compiled device tree blob, which is handed to the kernel by the boot loader, replacing a range of board-specific C source files and compile-time options in the kernel.

It is specified in a Devicetree Source file (.dts) and is compiled into a Devicetree Blob or device tree binary (.dtb) file through the Devicetree compiler (DTC). Device tree source files can include other files, referred to as device tree source includes.

It has been customary for ARM-based Linux distributions to include a boot loader, that necessarily was customized for specific boards, for example Raspberry Pi or Hackberry A10. This has created problems for the creators of Linux distributions as some part of the operating system must be compiled specifically for every board variant, or updated to support new boards. However, some modern SoCs (for example, Freescale i.MX6) have a vendor-provided boot loader with device tree on a separate chip from the operating system.

A proprietary configuration file format used for similar purposes, the FEX file format, is a de facto standard among Allwinner SoCs.

Windows 
Windows does not use DeviceTree (DTS file) as described here. Instead, it uses ACPI (ASL file) to discover and manage devices.

Coreboot 
The coreboot project makes use of device trees, but they are different from the flattened device trees used in the Linux kernel.

Example 
Example of Devicetree Source (DTS) format:
/dts-v1/;

/ {
    soc {
        flash_controller: flash-controller@4001e000 {
            reg = <0x4001e000 0x1000>;
            flash0: flash@0 {
                label = "SOC_FLASH";
                erase-block = <4096>;
            };
        };
    };
};

In the example above, the line /dts-v1/; signifies version 1 of the DTS syntax.

The tree has four nodes: / (root node), soc (stands for "system on a chip"), flash-controller@4001e000 and flash@0 (instance of flash which uses the flash controller). Besides these node names, the latter two nodes have labels flash_controller and flash0 respectively.

The latter two nodes have properties, which represent name/value pairs. Property label has string type, property erase-block has integer type and property reg is an array of integers (32-bit unsigned values). Property values can refer to other nodes in the devicetree by their phandles. Phandle for a node with label flash0 would be written as &flash0. Phandles are also 32-bit values.

Parts of the node names after the "at" sign (@) are unit addresses. Unit addresses specify a node's address in the address space of its parent node.

The above tree could be compiled by the standard DTC compiler to binary DTB format or assembly. In Zephyr RTOS, however, DTS files are compiled into C header files (.h), which are then used by the build system to compile code for a specific board.

See also 
 PCI configuration space
 Hardware abstraction
 Open Firmware

References

External links 
 
 Device Tree Reference eLinux.org
 Embedded Power Architecture Platform Requirements (ePAPR)
 About The Device Tree

Data structures by computing platform
Operating system technology
Firmware
ARM architecture